La Unión is a town and municipality in the Colombian department of Antioquia. It is part of the subregion of Eastern Antioquia.

Climate
La Unión has a relatively cold subtropical highland climate (Cfb). It has heavy rainfall year round.

References

Municipalities of Antioquia Department